Thomas John Feeney (September 4, 1894 – September 9, 1955) was a Roman Catholic bishop.

Born in Jamaica Plain, Boston, Massachusetts, Feeney was ordained a priest for the Society of Jesus June 23, 1929. On May 10, 1951, Feeney was appointed Vicar Apostolic of Carolina and Marshall Island and titular bishop of Angus and was ordained bishop on September 8, 1951.

Notes

1894 births
1955 deaths
Clergy from Boston
20th-century American Jesuits
20th-century American Roman Catholic titular bishops
Roman Catholic bishops of Caroline Islands
Jesuit bishops